Nyhavn 37 is an 18th-century property overlooking the Nyhavn Canal in central Copenhagen, Denmark. A distillery was from before 1756 until at least the 1860s operated in the yard. The building was listed in the Danish registry of protected buildings and places in 1923.

History

18th century

The property was listed as No. 14 in St. Ann's East Quarter in Copenhagen's first cadastre of 1689. It was at that time owned by skipper Peder Jensen. The present building on the site was constructed with two storeys over a walk-out basement some time between 1691 and 1712. The property was listed as No. 19 in the new cadastre of 1756 and was then owned by distiller Haagen Larsen.

The property was home to 15 residents in two households at the 1787 census. Peter Petersen Hals, a distiller, resided in the building with his wife Dorothea Simons, the wife's relative Cicilia Pouls Datter, a distiller, a distiller's apprentice and two maids. Christian Detlefsen Ishade, a helmsman, resided in the building with his wife Johanne Sørens Datter, their three children (aged two to six), one maid and two lodgers.

19th century
The property was home to 24 residents at the 1801 census. Rasmus Hansen, a 40-year-old man with no occupation mentioned, resided in the building with his wife Karen Hansen, their two children (aged one and six), three male servants and two maids. Jens Petersen, a 54-year-old man with no occupation mentioned, resided in the building with his wife Petronelle Hansdatter and their 10-year-old daughter. Peter Hansen, Jens Olsen  and Claus Hansen, three ship carpenters, were also residents of the building. Hans Poulsen Møller, a porcelain merchant, resided in the building with his wife Anne Margrethe Licht, their five children (aged two to seven) and two maids.

The property was again listed as No. 19 in the new cadastre of 1806. It was at that time still owned by Rasmus Hansen.

Karen Hansen was after her husband's death married to Jacob Petersen Maag. He continued the distillery at No. 10 in Nyhavn. Their property was home to 16 residents in three households at the 1834 census. Jacob and Karen Maag resided on the ground floor with their daughter Christiane Marie Caroline Maag, Karen's daughter Anne Chatrine Hansen and granddaughter Caroline Marie Rasemine Hansen, two male servants and two maids. Elisabeth Chatrine Fick, a 56-year-old widow seamstress, resided in the building with two daughters /aged 28 and 30) and one maid. Maren Boline Charlotte Amalie Frimann, a 24-year-old unmarried woman with means, resided in the building with her four-year-old daughter and one maid.

Jacob Petersen Maag was still the owner of the building in 1840. He was still resident on the ground floor with his wife, stepdaughter, two maids and three male servants.
 Peter Arendt, a ship captain, resided on the first floor with his wife Caroline Lillelund. Christian Mørch, another ship captain, resided on the second floor with his wife Ane Necolaisen and one maid.

Maag's daughter Christiane Caroline Marie Maag was married to Christian Magdatus Thesdrup Cold Leigh. The family's distillery was passed to them prior to the 1845 census. They resided on the ground floor with their two children (aged six and eight), three male servants and two maids. Karen Maag resided as a widow on the first floor with her daughter Anna Cathrine Hansen	and one maid. Christian Schyll, a skipper, resided on the second floor with his wife Sophie Hansine Paueline West and one maid.

Christiane Marie Caroline Leigh	managed the distillery in 1850. She is still mentioned as married in the census records from 1850 but her husband is not mentioned as a resident of the building. She resided on the two lower floors with her daughter Johanne Marie Catrine Elisabeth Leigh, her mother Karen Maag, her sister Anne Cathrine Hansen, three male servants and three maids. Christian Schytt, now listed as a helmsman (skibsfører), was still resident on the second floor with his wife Sophie Hansine Pouline Schytt, his foster son Waldemar Theodor Schytt	and  his wife's sister Andresine Cathrine West	 and one maid.

Christiane Marie Caroline Leigh (mée Maag) was still managing the distillery in 1860 and had by then become a widow. She resided in the building with her two daughters, her half sister, a housekeeper and two male servants. Christian Schytt was still resident on the second floor with his wife, sister-in-law and one maid.

20th century
Café Texas was for many years located on the ground floor. A tattoo shop was located in the basement.

Architecture
 
The building seem today originates in a two-storey, jaæf-timbered building constructed on the site some time between 1691 and 1712. The facade towards the street was reconstructed in brick in 1743. The building was heightened with one storey in 1791. The facade is plastered and red painted with white painted windows. It is crowned by a four-bay gabled wall dormer with cornice returns. The main entrance in the bay furthest to the left is topped by a transom window with coloured glass. A two-storey side wing extends from the rear side of the building. The walls on this side of the building are finished with black-painted timber framing and plastered, white-painted infills.

Today
The property was owned by Bodil Kirstine M Michaelsen in 2008. Restaurant Nyhavn 38 is based on the ground floor.

References

External links

 Source
 Source
 Source

Listed residential buildings in Copenhagen
Distilleries in Copenhagen